Stanghelle is a village in Vaksdal municipality in Vestland county, Norway. The village lies along the Veafjorden at the mouth of the Hellestraumen (a small branch off the main fjord).

The European route E16 highway runs through the village and the Bergen Line stops at the Stanghelle Station in this village.

References

Villages in Vestland
Vaksdal